The Europe Zone was one of the two regional zones of the 1930 International Lawn Tennis Challenge.

24 teams entered the Europe Zone, with the winner going on to compete in the Inter-Zonal Final against the winner of the America Zone. Italy defeated Japan in the final, and went on to face the United States in the Inter-Zonal Final.

Draw

First round

Great Britain vs. Germany

Poland vs. Romania

Switzerland vs. Australia

Ireland vs. Monaco

Greece vs. India

Hungary vs. Japan

Belgium vs. Spain

Yugoslavia vs. Sweden

Second round

Norway vs. Austria

Italy vs. Egypt

Great Britain vs. Poland

Ireland vs. Australia

Japan vs. India

Yugoslavia vs. Spain

Czechoslovakia vs. Denmark

Netherlands vs. Finland

Quarterfinals

Austria vs. Italy

Great Britain vs. Australia

Spain vs. Japan

Netherlands vs. Czechoslovakia

Semifinals

Italy vs. Australia

Czechoslovakia vs. Japan

Final

Italy vs. Japan

References

External links
Davis Cup official website

Davis Cup Europe/Africa Zone
Europe Zone
International Lawn Tennis Challenge